Brouilletts Creek Covered Bridge, also known as S Hill Covered Bridge and Furnace Road Bridge, was a historic Burr Arch Truss covered bridge located at Clinton, Vermillion County, Indiana. It was built in 1879, and is a single span covered timber bridge.  It measured 157 feet long.  The bridge was disassembled in 1994 and currently in storage in its entirety for reassembly in the future.

It was listed on the National Register of Historic Places in 1994 and delisted in 1999.

See also
Eugene Covered Bridge
Newport Covered Bridge
Possum Bottom Covered Bridge

References

Former National Register of Historic Places in Indiana
Covered bridges in Indiana
Bridges completed in 1879
Transportation buildings and structures in Vermillion County, Indiana
Wooden bridges in Indiana
Burr Truss bridges in the United States
Road bridges in Indiana